Jordan Daniel Wall is an American television and film actor.

Biography
Wall was born and raised in Clearwater, Florida, where he attended Clearwater High School. His parents are Dr. David and Batia Wall and his sister is Alona Wall. After graduating from high school in 2003, Wall attended the University of Florida, where he was a member of Sigma Nu fraternity and Phi Sigma Pi. He was also a sports anchor on the student-produced WUFT evening news. Wall graduated with a telecommunications degree in 2007. He began a professional acting career with roles in independent films and cable television. In 2010, Wall made his first appearance on the A&E TV series The Glades as the nerdy-minded, forensics laboratory technologist Daniel Green. The show was cancelled after its fourth season. In 2011, Wall made his first broadcast network appearance in Harry's Law, playing a young, newly qualified attorney opposite Kathy Bates and George Wendt.

Selected filmography
The Sacred (2009): Jared
Walk on Water (2009): Daniel
Surviving Disaster (2009): Buddy
The Glades (2010–2013): Daniel Green
Harry's Law (2011): Connor Bertram
USS Seaviper (2012): Lewis

References
http://dailyfreeman.com/articles/2010/07/06/life/doc4c328a1d478ab576281162.txt
http://www.imdb.com/name/nm3096096/
http://weblogs.sun-sentinel.com/entertainment/thingstodo/2012/05/the_glades_star_jordan_wall_ru.html

External links

1985 births
Living people
Male actors from Florida
American male television actors
Clearwater High School alumni
University of Florida alumni
People from Clearwater, Florida
Actors from Pinellas County, Florida